HMS Defence was a 74-gun third rate ship of the line of the Royal Navy, launched on 25 April 1815 at Chatham.

She was converted to serve as a prison ship in 1849. Defence was badly damaged by an accidental fire, probably caused by spontaneous combustion in a recently delivered load of coal, at Woolwich on 14 July 1857.</ref> The fire was extinguished by scuttling the ship.  and while it was not totally destroyed the remains were broken up later.

Citations

References

Lavery, Brian (2003) The Ship of the Line - Volume 1: The development of the battlefleet 1650-1850. Conway Maritime Press. .

External links 
 

Ships of the line of the Royal Navy
Vengeur-class ships of the line
Prison ships
Ships built in Chatham
1815 ships